Donald W. Suman (January 19, 1920 – February 5, 2015) was a college basketball coach. He was the head coach of Rice from 1949 to 1959. He coached Rice to a 132–105 record, winning one Southwest Conference championship and making one NCAA tournament appearance.  He also played college basketball and football as a student at Rice.  After leaving his coaching position, he took a front office position under Bud Adams for the Houston Oilers.  He was inducted into the Rice athletics Hall of Fame in 1987. He left Rice to become General Manager of the new Houston Oilers. In his first three seasons as GM the Oilers won the first two AFL championships. In his two seasons as GM the Oilers combined record was 20–7–1.

Suman died on February 5, 2015, in Houston.

Head coaching record

References

1920 births
2015 deaths
American men's basketball coaches
American men's basketball players
Basketball coaches from Texas
Basketball players from San Antonio
Houston Oilers executives
Rice Owls football players
Rice Owls men's basketball coaches
Rice Owls men's basketball players
Sportspeople from San Antonio